The 2014–15 Charlotte 49ers men's basketball team represented the University of North Carolina at Charlotte during the 2014–15 NCAA Division I men's basketball season. The 49ers, led by fifth head coach Alan Major, played their home games at the Dale F. Halton Arena and were  members Conference USA.  Major took an indefinite leave of absence January 6 for medical issues and was replaced by assistant coach Ryan Odom who finished the season as interim head coach.  After the season ended, Major and the university agreed to mutually part ways . They finished the season 14–18, 7–11 in C-USA play to finish in a tie for eleventh place. They lost in the first round of the C-USA tournament to Middle Tennessee.

Previous season
The 49ers finished the season 17–14, 7–9 in C-USA play to finish in a tie for eighth place. They advanced to the quarterfinals of the C-USA tournament where they lost to Louisiana Tech.

Departures

Incoming transfers

Class of 2014 recruits

Roster

Season Notes

Head Coach Alan Major would take an indefinite leave of absence due to medical reasons starting on January 6 following the game against Old Dominion. He would not return for the season. Assistant Head Coach Ryan Odom would lead the program for the remainder of the season.

True Freshman Torin Dorn would be named Conference USA Freshman of the Year as the 49ers' leading scorer, averaging 11.8 points per game. Senior Pierriá Henry was named to the C-USA All-Defensive Team for the second straight year, which also marked his third Conference All-Defensive Team selection overall.

Schedule

|-
!colspan=12 style="background:#006338; color:#FFFFFF;"| Exhibition

|-
!colspan=12 style="background:#006338; color:#FFFFFF;"| Regular season

|-
!colspan=12 style="background:#006338; color:#FFFFFF;"| Conference USA tournament

References

Charlotte
Charlotte 49ers men's basketball seasons